Jamalpur is a city and district headquarter of Jamalpur District in the division of Mymensingh, Bangladesh. It lies along the bank of the Old Brahmaputra river. As of 2011 it had a population of 142,764, of which 96.51% were Muslim and 3.46% Hindu.

References

Cities in Bangladesh